Camden Airport may refer to:

Camden Airport (New South Wales), an airport located in Camden, New South Wales, Australia
Camden Airstrip, an airfield in Couva, Trinidad and Tobago
Camden Central Airport, a defunct airport located in Camden, New Jersey, United States
Camden County Airport, an airport near Berlin, New Jersey. United States
Camden Municipal Airport, an airport located in Camden, Alabama, United States
Harrell Field, an airport located in Camden, Arkansas, United States